World Obesity Day is observed globally on 4 March as of March 2020 (having previously been observed on the 11th October) with the view of promoting practical solutions to end the global obesity crisis. 

It is organized by the World Obesity Federation, a non-profit body which is in official relations with the World Health Organization and is a collaborating body on the Lancet Commission on Obesity. World Obesity states that its aim is to "lead and drive global efforts to reduce, prevent and treat obesity." 

The first World Obesity Day took place in 2015. The second took place in 2016 and focused on childhood obesity, aligning with the WHO Commission report on Ending Childhood Obesity. 

World Obesity Day 2017 was themed "treat obesity now and avoid the consequences later." It called for investment in treatment services to support people affected by obesity, early intervention to improve the success of treatment, and prevention to reduce the need for treatment.

Links 
 World Obesity Day website
 WHO Commission report on Ending Childhood Obesity
 The Lancet

References 

Obesity
Health awareness days
October observances